There are several lakes named Mud Lake within the U.S. state of Illinois.

 Mud Lake, Barrington Hills, Cook County, Illinois.		
 Mud Lake (historic), Chicago, Cook County, Illinois. Was part of the Chicago Portage. No longer exists.
 Mud Lake, Gallatin County, Illinois.	
 Mud Lake, Lake County, Illinois.		
 Mud Lake, Mason County, Illinois.		
 Mud Lake, Sangamon County, Illinois.

References
 USGS-U.S. Board on Geographic Names

Lakes of Illinois